Sphingonaepiopsis malgassica is a moth of the family Sphingidae. It is known from Madagascar.

The basal half of the forewing upperside is brown. There is a dark triangular area with its base on the outer margin near the hind angle and a similar triangle with its base on the costal margin. The apical area distal to these triangles is the same colour as the basal half. The forewing underside is orange red, with brown patches and the marginal band is narrow. The hindwing upperside is yellow basally, darkening to orange distally and eventually to dark brown at the outer margin. The hindwing underside is dark orange red, heavily scattered with brown scales. The outer marginal band is narrow and irregular.

References

Sphingonaepiopsis
Moths described in 1929
Moths of Madagascar
Moths of Africa
Taxa named by Benjamin Preston Clark